A tactical beacon or TACBE as it is often known to be used by British and American armed forces (usually by Special Forces) for many years. Its primary role is to contact planes or helicopters which may be overhead or nearby.
The system's main use is a distress signal, sending out a constant danger message to AWACS planes. However, it can also be used as a short range communications device with local aircraft. Using it indicates that one is in danger and needs help.

Military equipment post-1945
Military radio systems
Distress signals